GLAST may refer to:

 Fermi Gamma-ray Space Telescope, formerly the Gamma-ray Large Area Space Telescope 
 GLutamate ASpartate Transporter, a protein in humans
 GLAST (tokamak), a set of fusion research reactors of the Pakistan Atomic Energy Commission (PAEC)